Eight hundred and thirty-one municipalities in the Canadian province of Quebec held municipal elections to elect mayors and councillors on November 7, 1993. Incumbent mayor Jean-Paul L'Allier was re-elected in Quebec City and his Rassemblement Populaire party won sixteen out of twenty council seats.

Municipal elections were not held in Montreal, Quebec's largest city, in this electoral cycle. The previous municipal election in Montreal took place in 1990 and the next was scheduled for 1994.

Results

Laval

Source: "Incumbents all re-elected in Montreal East voting," Montreal Gazette, 9 November 1993, A6.

Verdun

Party colours have been randomly chosen and do not indicate affiliation with or resemblance to any municipal, provincial, or federal party.

Source: "Incumbents all re-elected in Montreal East voting," Montreal Gazette, 9 November 1993, A6.

References

 
1993